Tuckia is a genus of moths belonging to the family Tortricidae.

Species
Tuckia africana (Walsingham, 1881)
Tuckia zuluana Razowski, 2001

See also
List of Tortricidae genera

References

 , 2005: World catalogue of insects volume 5 Tortricidae.
 , 2013: An illustrated catalogue of the specimens of Tortricidae in the Iziko South African Museum, Cape Town (Lepidoptera: Tortricidae). Shilap Revista de Lepidopterologia 41 (162): 213–240.

External links
tortricidae.com

Archipini
Tortricidae genera